John Calvey (23 June 1875 – 1937) was an English international footballer, who played as a centre forward.

Career
Born in South Bank, Calvey played professionally for Nottingham Forest, and earned one cap for England in 1902.

References

1875 births
1937 deaths
English footballers
England international footballers
Nottingham Forest F.C. players
English Football League players
English Football League representative players
Association football forwards